Pénélope Leprevost (born 1 August 1980) is a French equestrian who competes in the sport of show jumping. At the 2012 Summer Olympics, Leprevost placed 12th with the French team on Mylord Carthago*HN. She won a team gold medal at the 2016 Summer Olympics.

Personal life
Leprevost started competing in horse riding at the age of six. She boards her horses at a stable near Lisieux, and owns the company Penelope Boutique, which specializes in horse tack and equestrian supplies. She is a single mother, and her parents moved next to her home to help to raise her daughter Eden Blin Lebreton when her mother is away on competitions.

International Championship Results

References 

1980 births
Living people
Equestrians at the 2012 Summer Olympics
Equestrians at the 2016 Summer Olympics
French female equestrians
French show jumping riders
Olympic equestrians of France
Sportspeople from Rouen
Olympic gold medalists for France
Olympic medalists in equestrian
Medalists at the 2016 Summer Olympics
Equestrians at the 2020 Summer Olympics